Emmanuel Lepeintre, real name Emmanuel Augustin Lepeintre called Lepeintre jeune or Lepeintre Cadet, (22 September 1790 – 24 February 1847) was a French stage actor, chansonnier and playwright.

Biographie 
He began his acting career aged ten at the Théâtre des Jeunes-Artistes in the role of Cassandra in Hasard corrigé par l'amour, a vaudeville by Philidor Rochelle.

A comic actor at the Théâtre des Variétés and at the Théâtre du Vaudeville from 1818 to 1843, he played the role of Dugazon in Le duel et le déjeuner ou Les comédiens joués by Mélesville (1818) and also that of Hamelin in La famille improvisée by Nicolas Brazier (1840). He was famous for his obesity and his bons mots.

Works 
1814: La fête de famille, opéra-vaudeville, impromptu, in 1 act and free verse
1820: Le Cirque Bojolay, ou Pleuvra-t-il ? ne pleuvra-t-il pas ?, à propos-parodie-vaudeville in 1 act
1820: Écoutons ! ! !, scènes improvisées, à l'occasion de la naissance de S. A. R. Mgr le duc de Bordeaux, with Amable de Saint-Hilaire
1831: M. Mayeux, ou Le Bossu à la mode, à propos de bosses en 3 tableaux, mêlé de vaudevilles, with Saint-Hilaire and Eugène Hyacinthe Laffillard
1833: La Citadelle d'Anvers, ou le Séjour et la conquête, à-propos en 2 actes, mingled with couplets
1840: Insomnies de Lepeintre jeune le fracturé, mises au jour, la nuit, par lui et ses deux gardes-malade
1840: Loisirs d'une convalescence, bêtises de Lepeintre jeune
1840: Pot-pourri, à propos de la première et dernière représentation de Vautrin
1843: Physiologie du parrain
1848: Œuvres badines et posthumes de Lepeintre jeune, songs, parodies, jokes and puns

Bibliography 
 J. Hippolyte Daniel, Biographie des hommes remarquables de Seine-et-Oise, 1837, (p. 77-78) (Lire en ligne)
 Pierre Larousse, Grand dictionnaire universel du XIXe siècle, 1873
 Henry Lyonnet, Dictionnaire des comédiens français, 1911, (p. 355)

References 

French male stage actors
19th-century French dramatists and playwrights
French chansonniers
People from Versailles
1790 births
1847 deaths